Megachile quartinae is a species of bee in the family Megachilidae. It was described by Gribodo in 1884.

References

Quartinae
Insects described in 1884